Mohyal Brahmins (or Potohari Brahmins) are an Indian sub-caste of Saraswat Brahmins from the Punjab region, who are sometimes referred to as 'Warrior Brahmins'.

Mohyals were originally natives of the Gandhara region of Ancient India, where they originate from; although the region is now divided between northeastern-Afghanistan and northwestern-Pakistan.

Prior to the Partition of India, Mohyal Brahmins lived primarily in the Potohar and Hazara regions of Northern Punjab and North-West Frontier Province (Rawalpindi, Chakwal, Jhelum, Shahpur, Sargodha, Campbellpur, Haripur, Mansehra, Abbottabad and Murree) and in the Pahari regions of Jammu and Kashmir (Pulandari, Mirpur, Kotli, Muzaffarabad, Poonch, Rawlakote, Bagh and Rajouri). After the partition, they migrated to, and settled in the neighbouring Indian states of Punjab, Jammu and Kashmir and Delhi.

Mohyal Brahmins were not priests in traditional sense as they abandoned their priestly duties. They were warriors, spiritual healers and preachers of different sects of Hinduism.

Mohyal Brahmins are a caste and a sub-group of the Punjabi Hindu community. The members of this sub-caste originate from the broader Saraswat Brahmin group and comprise seven clans named Bali, Bhimwal, Chhibber, Datt, Lau, Mohan and Vaid. These each claim their lineage from one of seven different Brahmin rishis.

Mohyal clans have the privilege of using prestigious courtesy titles like Bakshi, Raizada, Bhai, Chaudhri, Dewan, Malik, Jaitly, Mehta, Khan and Sultan; which were bestowed on them by the Mughal emperors and the Sikh rulers. These epithets have a Persian connotation and imply a high-class status.

Some Mohyal Brahmins also have an association with Shia Muslims because they helped Imam Hussain in the Battle of Karbala, these Mohyals are called Hussaini Brahmins.

Certain scholars have suggested a cultural connection between Mohyals of Punjab (Vaids in particular) and the Baidya (Vaidya) community of Bengal, although not genetically. Sena dynasty of Bengal is identified as Vaidya, and Brahmakshatriya (i.e., Warrior Brahmins). According to historian T.P. Russell Stracey, "Vaidya is a different rendering of Vaid". Panchanan Raya referred to the Lau clan as being descendants of a branch of Sena kings, and he also connected the Mohyals with Bengali Baidyas and stated that many families of the latter clan merged with the former clan. Dhanvantari gotra is found as the original gotra among the Bengali Baidyas, which is also the gotra of the Mohyal Vaids.

The Mohyals Brahmin stopped practising priestly duties. The same tradition is seen amongst the Bhumihar Brahmins and the Bengali Baidya clan, who despite following Brahmin varna-rituals, are often considered as Semi-Brahmins for not performing priestly duties.

Mohyal Brahmins of Punjab, along with Tyagi Brahmins of Haryana, Delhi and Western Uttar Pradesh; Nambudiri Malayali Brahmins of Kerala; and Bhumihar Brahmins of Madhya Pradesh, Bihar and Eastern Uttar Pradesh are known as the Brahmarshi community of Brahmins in India, though they are a different section of Brahmins than the above-mentioned groups.

The Mohyal Jati, is split into further clans with each family name tracing their origin myth to a certain Vedic figure.

Contributions to Sikhism

Spirituality and identity 

The majority of Mohyal Brahmins identify as Hindu, with some also identifying as Sikh. Guru Nanak revitalised faith in order to make it accessible for the common people of late Medieval India. As a part of this transformation, many Punjabi Hindus, including the Mohyals, revered and followed Guru Nanak. This devotion towards Nanak's mat (teachings/wisdom) led them to follow Nanak's successors and then assist in the creation of the Sikh ethos. Moreover, as the latter Gurus became martial, this community was a natural home for the warrior-class of Punjabi Hindus.

Guru Nanak, continuing in the tradition of Bhakti Saints, revitalised Sanatan ('Hindu') wisdom in order to make to accessible for the common people of late Medieval India. As a part of this transformation, many Punjabi Hindus, including the Mohyals, revered and followed Guru Nanak. Its worth mentioning that a distinct Sikh religious identity was not created until the 19th century, thus, referring to the period of the Gurus as 'Sikhism' is not problematic.

Guru period

Other notable Mohyals include the brothers Bhai Mati Das and Bhai Sati Das, who both died alongside the ninth Guru, Guru Tegh Bahadur, for protecting Hindu Religion from Islamic Jihad. As the family of the latter Gurus and this Chhibber family were close, Bhai Chaupa Singh Chhibber became a care-taker of Guru Gobind Singh, the tenth guru.

Post Gurus Period

Even after the death of the Gurus, the Mohyals were heavily imbedded into their legacy. They held high-ranking positions such as Dewans during the time of the latter Gurus to during the reign of Maharaja Ranjit Singh Sukerchakia and the Sikh Empire. Mohyals were instrumental in keeping the wisdom of the Gurus alive and historians such as Bhai Kesar Singh Chhibber wrote one of the seminal works of early Sikh history - Bansavalinama (published in 1769).

Other Mohyal families besides Chhibbers played significant role too, for example, Sardar Mahan Singh Mirpuri belonged to the Bali clan and was 2nd in Command of the Khalsa Army. Mohyal Hindus were high-ranking officers in various Sikh Armies, this led to these 'brave warriors' joining 'Sikh Regiments' during the British Raj of India.

See also
 Punjabi Hindus
 Saraswat Brahmins
 Hussaini Brahmins
 Brahmarshi

List of notable Mohyal Brahmins

 Sunil Dutt

References

External links
 Official Website of General Mohyal Sabha
 Hindu followers of Muslim imam, The Milli Gazette, Vol.5 No.10, (16–31 May 04)
 Official Website of Educational Institution Directly run by G.M.S.

Indian castes
Mohyal
Brahmins
Hindu communities
Hindu communities of Pakistan
Punjabi Brahmins
Brahmin communities
Brahmin communities of India
Brahmin communities across India
Punjabi tribes
Social groups of Delhi
Social groups of Punjab, India
Social groups of Jammu and Kashmir
Social groups of India
Social groups of Pakistan
Tribes of Rawalpindi District